Vardenik is a village in the Martuni Municipality of the Gegharkunik Province of Armenia, that sits along the Vardenis River. The cyclopean fort ruins of Kaftarli are located 3 km south of the village, with petroglyphs being present downhill along the bank of the river. Some churches and shrines can be found in the vicinity. The village is the largest rural community in Armenia by population.

Etymology 
The village was previously known as Gezeldara, Nerkin Gezaldara, Gyuzeldara and Nizhnyaya Gezaldara.

History 
The village was founded in 1828-29 by emigrants from Mush.

Gallery

References

External links 

 
 

Populated places in Gegharkunik Province
Populated places established in 1828